Kappa-carrageenase (kappa-carrageenan 4-beta-D-glycanohydrolase) is an enzyme with systematic name kappa-carrageenan 4-beta-D-glycanohydrolase (configuration-retaining). This enzyme catalyses the following chemical reaction

 Endohydrolysis of (1->4)-beta-D-linkages between D-galactose 4-sulfate and 3,6-anhydro-D-galactose in kappa-carrageenans

The main products of hydrolysis are neocarrabiose-sulfate and neocarratetraose-sulfate.

References

External links 
 

EC 3.2.1